Charlotte Jennifer Villamayor de Leon El Soury (born February 16, 1971), known professionally as Lotlot de Leon, is a Filipino actress.

Career
She was a member of That's Entertainment, along with Ramon "Monching" Christopher as her love-team partner. The Lotlot-Monching was a popular love team in the late 1980s. They were paired in Bunsong Kerubin (1987), Love Boat: Mahal Trip Kita (1988), Love Letters (1988), Here Comes the Bride (1989), Mga Kuwento ng Pag-big (1989) and Hotdog (1990), among others. She is now back on ABS-CBN in Walang Hanggang Paalam after her 7 years of work with GMA Network.

Personal life
Former US Navy Donald Olson and Eva Rodriguez are her biological parents. Nora Aunor and Christoper de Leon are her adoptive parents She is also the adoptive sister of actress Matet de Leon, actor Ian de Leon, Kenneth and Kiko.

She was married to former matinee idol Ramon Christopher Gutierrez (son of Eddie Gutierrez) on March 27, 1989 until they became separated in 2010. They have four children: 3 daughters and 1 son, Diego Gutierrez. Her eldest daughter Janine Gutierrez is now an actress in ABS-CBN and was formerly with GMA Network.

On December 17, 2018, she married Fadi El Soury whom she was engaged with since July 2018.

Filmography

Film
Nino Valiente (1975)
Relaks Lang Mama, Sagot Kita (1976)
Ibalik ang Swerte (1981)
Hello, Young Lovers (1981)
I Love You Mama, I Love You Papa (1986)
Mahiwagang Singsing (1986)
Balimbing (1986) 
Halimaw sa Banga (1986)
Takot Ako, Eh! (1987)
Bunsong Kerubin (1987)
Prinsesang Gusgusin (1987)
Tatlong Ina, Isang Anak (1987)
Mga Anak ni Facifica Falayfay (1987)
1 + 1 = 12 (+ 1): One Plus One Equals Twelve (Cheaper by the Dozen) (1987)
Fly Me to the Moon (1988)
Love Boat: Mahal Trip Kita (1988)
Sana Mahalin Mo Ako (1988)
Nakausap Ko ang Birhen (1988)
Wake Up Little Susie (1988) - Luglug de Leon
Nasaan Ka Inay? (1988)
Love Letters (1988)
Sa Akin Pa Rin ang Bukas (1988)
Sa Puso Ko Hahalik ang Mundo (1988)
Tiyanak (1988)
Mga Kuwento ng Pag-ibig (1989)
Here Comes the Bride (1989)
Kung Maibabalik Ko Lang (1989)
Juan Tanga, Super Naman at ang Kambal Na Tiyanak (1990)
Hotdog (1990)
Shake, Rattle & Roll II (1990)
Tatlong Maria (1991)
Joey Boy Munti, 15 Anyos Ka sa Muntinlupa (1991)
Ang Totoong Buhay ni Pacita M. (1991)
Milan (2004)
Feng Shui (2004) as Alice
Tiyanaks (2007) as Aling Mildred
I've Fallen for You (2007)
Caregiver (2008)
Way Back Home (2011)
Kubot: The Aswang Chronicles (2014 GMA Films)
Feng Shui 2 (2014)
Dagsin (2016)
Mang Kepweng Returns (2017 VIVA Films)
Can't Help Falling in Love (2017) as Mama Two
1st Sem (2017)
Miss Granny (2018 VIVA Films)
Class of 2018 (2018 T-Rex Entertainment)
Isa Pa with Feelings (2019 Black Sheep Productions)
On the Job: The Missing 8 (2021 Reality Entertainment, Globe Studios) as Weng
That Boy In The Dark (2023 BMW8 Entertainment Productions)

Television

Awards

Notes

References

External links

1972 births
Living people
ABS-CBN personalities
De Leon family
Filipino film actresses
Filipino people of American descent
Filipino women comedians
GMA Network personalities
People from Metro Manila
Radio Philippines Network personalities
Tagalog people
That's Entertainment (Philippine TV series)
That's Entertainment Monday Group Members